Malindu Maduranga (born 11 October 1997) is a Sri Lankan cricketer. He made his first-class debut for Colombo Cricket Club in the 2016–17 Premier League Tournament on 28 January 2017. He made his List A debut for Colombo District in the 2016–17 Districts One Day Tournament on 22 March 2017. He made his Twenty20 debut for Colombo Cricket Club in the 2017–18 SLC Twenty20 Tournament on 1 March 2018. In November 2021, he was selected to play for the Colombo Stars following the players' draft for the 2021 Lanka Premier League.

References

External links
 

1997 births
Living people
Sri Lankan cricketers
Colombo Cricket Club cricketers
Colombo District cricketers
Cricketers from Colombo